Villa Ocampo is the former house of Victoria Ocampo (1890–1979), one of Argentina's greatest cultural figures, founder and director of Sur magazine. The house is located in San Isidro, Buenos Aires Province.

Creative guests
Originally the summer house of the Ocampo family, it became Victoria Ocampo's permanent residence in 1940. The house is famous for its list of distinguished visitors who came to Argentina invited by Victoria: Rabindranath Tagore, Igor Stravinsky, Le Corbusier, Albert Camus, Graham Greene, Federico García Lorca, André Malraux, José Ortega y Gasset, Antoine de Saint-Exupéry, Saint-John Perse (Alexis Léger), among many others. Villa Ocampo was also a regular meeting place for Argentine writers, among them Jorge Luis Borges and Adolfo Bioy Casares, who met there for the first time in 1931. It was the inspiration for the Blue Villa in Alain Robbe-Grillet's 1965 novel La Maison de rendez-vous.

Design
The Villa was built in 1891 by Manuel Ocampo, Victoria’s father. Its architecture is eclectic, combining influences of British and French origin. The house is surrounded by an 11,000 m² historical garden and hosts an important collection of art, furnishings and a library of 12,000 books, photographs, letters and personal papers of Victoria Ocampo.

Landmark
The house has been owned by UNESCO since 1973. It was fully restored in 2003 and is now a cultural center open to the public. It welcomes guests from around the world and hosts meetings for distinguished groups such as the Fulbright NEXUS group in 2011.

Houses in Argentina
Argentine culture
UNESCO
Houses completed in 1891
Architecture in Argentina